Volkovo is a rural locality (a village) in Gorodetskoye Rural Settlement, Kichmengsko-Gorodetsky District, Vologda Oblast, Russia. The population was 16 as of 2002.

Geography 
Volkovo is located 12 km southwest of Kichmengsky Gorodok (the district's administrative centre) by road. Shonga is the nearest rural locality.

References 

Rural localities in Kichmengsko-Gorodetsky District